In Greek mythology, Abrota or Habrotê, was the daughter of eponymous King Onchestus of the Boeotian city of Onchestos and sister of Megareus. Nisos, the king of Megara in the time of his reign married her and the supposed mother of his daughters, Scylla, Iphinoe and Eurynome.

Mythology 
On the death of his beloved wife, Abrota, Nisos commanded all the Megarian women to wear a garment of the same kind as Abrota had worn, which was called aphabroma, and was still in use in the time of Plutarch.

Notes

References 

 Bell, Robert E., Women of Classical Mythology: A Biographical Dictionary. ABC-Clio. 1991. .
Gaius Julius Hyginus, Fabulae from The Myths of Hyginus translated and edited by Mary Grant. University of Kansas Publications in Humanistic Studies. Online version at the Topos Text Project.
Hesiod, Catalogue of Women from Homeric Hymns, Epic Cycle, Homerica translated by Evelyn-White, H G. Loeb Classical Library Volume 57. London: William Heinemann, 1914. Online version at theio.com
 Lucius Mestrius Plutarchus, Moralia with an English Translation by Frank Cole Babbitt. Cambridge, MA. Harvard University Press. London. William Heinemann Ltd. 1936. Online version at the Perseus Digital Library. Greek text available from the same website.
 Pausanias, Description of Greece with an English Translation by W.H.S. Jones, Litt.D., and H.A. Ormerod, M.A., in 4 Volumes. Cambridge, MA, Harvard University Press; London, William Heinemann Ltd. 1918. . Online version at the Perseus Digital Library
 Pausanias, Graeciae Descriptio. 3 vols. Leipzig, Teubner. 1903.  Greek text available at the Perseus Digital Library.

Princesses in Greek mythology
Queens in Greek mythology

Boeotian characters in Greek mythology
Megarian characters in Greek mythology